Paul Sorensen (February 16, 1926 – July 17, 2008) was an American film, theater and television actor who appeared in hundreds of roles during his career, including The Brady Bunch and Dallas. He was frequently cast in westerns or as a police officer.

Early years 
Sorenson was born in Kenosha, Wisconsin. He moved to Hollywood, California, in 1945 and enrolled in the Pasadena Playhouse, from which he graduated two years later.

Sorenson served 15 months with the U.S. Army's 25th Division during the Korean War.

Career 
Sorensen returned to California after the war and resumed acting. His professional stage debut came in Born Yesterday at the Sartu Theater.

A talent agent signed Sorenson after watching him perform in a theater production of Born Yesterday. He was cast in his first television role as the deputy-turned-bandit Billy Stiles in the 1954-1955 syndicated Stories of the Century, a western series starring and narrated by Jim Davis.

One of Sorensen's best known characters was a recurring role as Andy Bradley, a member of an oil cartel, on Dallas. He appeared in recurring television roles in The Brady Bunch, Barnaby Jones and Fred MacMurray's My Three Sons. His television career, which spanned from the 1950s to the 1980s also included work on  The Mary Tyler Moore Show, My Favorite Martian, The Rockford Files and The Mod Squad. Sorensen was often cast in such westerns as Jefferson Drum, The Rifleman, Rin Tin Tin, Gunsmoke, Have Gun, Will Travel, The High Chaparral, Cheyenne, Cimarron City, Johnny Ringo, Wagon Train, The Virginian, and The Big Valley.

Sorensen's film credits included Hang 'em High and Escape to Witch Mountain.

Off screen, Sorensen and twenty-four other actors founded the Orchard Gables Repertory Theater group, which Time magazine has praised as "an oasis in the heart of Hollywood." Sorensen and his wife Jacqueline also ran the Original Actors Workshop.

Later years 
Sorensen retired from acting during the late 1980s and early 1990s. Sorensen, his wife, and one of their two sons, Christian, all became ordained ministers and the youngest son David followed in his parents footsteps and worked behind the scenes in the entertainment industry.

Personal life 
He married Jacqueline May in September 1957; she died on November 14, 2002. Sorensen died on July 17, 2008, in Cardiff-by-the-Sea, California, at the age of eighty-two. He was survived by his sons, a sister, and a grandson.

Recognition 
He was honored by the Pasadena Playhouse with a lifetime achievement award.

Selected filmography

 Las Vegas Shakedown (1955) - Airplane Passenger (uncredited)
 Inside Detroit (1956) - Blair's U.A.W. Friend (uncredited)
 Glory (1956) - Police Radio Dispatcher (uncredited)
 The Women of Pitcairn Island (1956) - Sam Allard
 The Brass Legend (1956) - Burly Apache Bend Townsman
 Dance with Me, Henry (1956) - Dutch
 Battle Hymn (1957) - Sentry
 House of Numbers (1957) - Patrolman (uncredited)
 The True Story of Lynn Stuart (1958) - Truck Driver (uncredited)
 Seven Ways from Sundown (1960) - Townsman of Beeker's Crossing (uncredited)
 Sea Hunt (1960, Season 3, Episode 14) - Pete
 The Great Impostor (1961) - Guard (uncredited)
 The Steel Claw (1961) - Sgt. Frank Powers
 Flower Drum Song (1961) - TV Sheriff (uncredited)
 Kid Galahad (1962) - Joe (uncredited)
 It's a Mad, Mad, Mad, Mad World (1963) - Hardhat in crowd next to Joe E Brown. (uncredited)
 Captain Newman, M.D. (1963) - Military Policeman at Christmas Party (uncredited)
 The Satan Bug (1965) - SDI Agent Posing as Motorist at Accident (uncredited)
 Torn Curtain (1966) - Swedish Immigration Officer (uncredited)
 Chamber of Horrors (1966) - Baltimore Bartender (uncredited)
 A Guide for the Married Man (1967) - Detective (uncredited)
 Madigan (1968) - Benesh Look-Alike in Saloon
 Hang 'Em High (1968) - Prisoner on Scaffold
 Live a Little, Love a Little (1968) - Workman (uncredited)
 Mark of the Gun (1969) - Sheriff
 The Big Bounce (1969) - Senator's associate
 Support Your Local Sheriff! (1969) - Man Installing Jail Cell Bars (uncredited)
 Suppose They Gave a War and Nobody Came (1970) - Deputy Randy
 Evel Knievel (1971) - Head Guard
 The Resurrection of Zachary Wheeler (1971) - Thompson
 Honky (1971)
 Girls on the Road (1972) - Mr. Rae
 Mission Impossible (1972) - Tower Guard /TV Episode: "Committed"
 Lapin 360 (1972)
 One Little Indian (1973) - The Guard
 Westworld (1973) - 2nd Male Interviewee (uncredited)
 Executive Action (1973) - Officer Brown
 Escape to Witch Mountain (1975) - Police Sgt. Foss
 The Shaggy D.A. (1976) - Policeman in Squad Car (uncredited)
 Smokey and the Bandit (1977) - DOT Inspector (uncredited)
 First Family (1980) - C.I.A. Director Willie O'Malley
 Star Trek III: The Search for Spock (1983) - Captain
 Cage (1989) - Matt
 Dropping Evil (2012) - Secret Service Agent (uncredited) (final film role)

References

External links 
 

1926 births
2008 deaths
American male film actors
American male television actors
American male stage actors
Male Western (genre) film actors
Drama teachers
Actors from Kenosha, Wisconsin
People from Encinitas, California
People from Greater Los Angeles
United States Army personnel of the Korean War
American Christian clergy
Protestant religious leaders
20th-century American male actors
20th-century American clergy